Postira is a village and a municipality in Croatia in the Split-Dalmatia County on the island of Brač.

Geography
The village of Postira is located on the northern coast of the island of Brač, eight kilometers from the island's port of Supetar. It is connected with nearby villages Pučišća, Splitska and Dol as well as with the city of Supetar with paved road, where local bus lines operate.

The municipality has a total population of 1,559 in two settlements:
 Dol, population 139
 Postira, population 1,429

In the 2011 census, 98.5% of the population were Croats.

History

Postira was first mentioned in the 14th century. It is assumed that its name come from the Latin pastura. Several stone buildings and palaces speak of the rich merchant history of the village, most of which are still standing. They were built using the special Brač stone from the surrounding quarries.

Economy

The main activities are fishing, agriculture, and tourism.

Home products are olive oil and local wine. Sardina d.d. company can fish producer from the high quality Adriatic pilchard Sardina pilchardus.

Next to the harbour are the beaches of Prvija and Zastivanje. Beach Mala Lozna is on the east end of Postira village and far more to the east, is the very attractive sand beach, Lovrečina. Near Lovrečina beach are the ruins of a large early Christian basilica from the 5th-6th century.

There are hotels Pastura, Vrilo and Lipa in the village and many private apartments. Near the port is supermarket Studenac, bakery, bank, post and market. There are also several restaurants and tourist information center.

Culture

In the center of the village is the Church of John the Baptist (Sv. Ivan Krstitelj).

Sport

N.K. Postira ex Kolektivac is local football club.

Notable persons
(in chronological order)

Ivan Matija Škarić dr.theology, Croatian translated interpretation of the Holy Bible (1793–1871)
Vladimir Nazor (1876–1949), poet and writer, who was born in Postira 
Ruggero Tommaseo, writer and journalist, killed by communists 18.9.1943.
Josip Škarić (1889–1975), physician, founder of the Higijenski zavod the first bacteriology station in Balkan region

References

External links 
Home page Postira: Home page Postira
Sardina d.d. company
 Postira-Brač Online

Brač
Municipalities of Croatia
Populated places in Split-Dalmatia County
Populated coastal places in Croatia